Zhuanqiao is an above-ground station on Line 5 of the Shanghai Metro. Located at the intersection of Humin Highway and Zhuanxing Road in the city's Minhang District, the station opened with the rest of the first phase of Line 5 on 25 November 2003. Since 26 December 2020, both the main and the branch line trains run all the way to Xinzhuang with no shuttle service.

References

Railway stations in Shanghai
Shanghai Metro stations in Minhang District
Line 5, Shanghai Metro
Railway stations in China opened in 2003